Woosong University, is a 4-year university, located in Daejeon, South Korea providing a specialized curriculum based on foreign-language and IT education for every major field of study.

History 
 1954: Woosong Educational Foundation established
 1995: Opening of Woosong University (8 Departments, 950 students enlisted)
 1996: Graduate School of Industrial Information established
 2007: Sobridge International School of Business established
 2009: Establishment of Nursing Science Department
 2011: Sol Hospital, a simulated hospital, opened.
 2014: Sol International School (SIS) opened
 2016: Endicott College established

Symbols 
Logo: It was used in 1996 as a municipal university.. This is the expression of the practical academy of the mailer with the foundation of the academic, scientific thinking, and practicality, and aims to nurture the necessary manpower that is recognized in society.

Symbolic animals: Falcon is used to symbolize solitude and passion.

Symbol Tree: It is a pine tree. It contains the willingness of students to devote themselves to their studies, just like a pine tree that does not shake in the wind. It is also a symbol of the school corporation, and is used in the name of Sol Bridge, Soldorado, and Solfain.

CHARACTER: I was writing a character who personified Falcon, but since 2008, I have been using characters that personified the airplane. This is in line with the internationalization strategy program WORLD STUDENT PLAN.

Undergraduate Schools 
 Undergraduate School of Design and Information
 Undergraduate School of Health and Welfare
 Undergraduate School of International Studies
 Undergraduate School of Railroad Transportation
 Undergraduate School of Tourism and Culinary Management
 Undergraduate School of Business SolBridge (B.B.A.)
 Undergraduate School of Sol International School (Culinary Art, Railroad Integrated Systems, Medical Services Management, Hotel Management, Media and Communication Art, Restaurant and Food Service Entrepreneurship)

Graduate Schools 
 Graduate School of Industrial Information
 Department of Computer Design
 Graduate School of TESOL-MALL
 Graduate School of Health and Welfare
 Graduate School of Management
 SolBridge International School of Business

Campus 
The main campus is located in Jayang-dong, Dong-ku, Daejeon.

The History of University 
Woosong University belongs to the Woosong Education Foundation which has a history of work in education, teaching and training. Founded by the late Kim Jung-Woo.

Woosong University is a specialized university, located in Daejeon, South Korea providing specialized curricula based on practice and theory. It currently runs three international schools: SolBridge International School of Business, Sol International School and Endicott College of International Studies. Education in the International schools is conducted solely in English. Since the establishment of the university in 1995, Woosong University has signed more than 100 Memorandums of Understanding (MOU) with universities and schools in more than 30 countries. Among the programs that have been developed are student and faculty exchange programs, joint research, dual degree, Study Abroad, and other programs.

International Education System 
 Sol International School (SIS)
Sol International School (SIS) was created in 2014, as a result of Woosong University's "Global Initiative". SIS offers six English-instructed specialized international programs in the fields of Culinary Arts (SICA), Hotel Management (SIHOM), Medical Services Management (SIMED), Railroad Integrated Systems (SIRA), Restaurant & Food Service Entrepreneurship (SIRES) and Media & Communications Arts (SIMA), for the completion of four-year bachelor's degrees in each program. Two-year associate degrees are also offered in Hotel Management and Culinary Arts.

Students are admitted based on past academic achievements and English language performance score. Newly admitted full-time students are awarded with up to 70% scholarship covering tuition and enrollment fees based on cumulative GPA and English test score (if applicable).

 Endicott College

Endicott College of International Studies was established in 2016.

See also 
 List of colleges and universities in South Korea
 Education in South Korea
 SolBridge International School of Business
 Endicott College

Universities and colleges in Daejeon
Educational institutions established in 1995
1995 establishments in South Korea